The Sheikh Jassim Cup is an annual men's super cup competition in Qatari football held between the winner of the Qatar Stars League and the Emir of Qatar Cup.

History
The inaugural Sheikh Jassim Cup was held in 1977. Prior to the 2014 Sheikh Jassim Cup, all 18 Qatari football clubs competed in the cup. Under this format, the teams were divided into four groups with the winners from each group qualifying for the semi-finals.

The cup serves the opening event to the Qatar's football season. Al Sadd SC are the most successful team in the competition's history, having won the trophy on 15 occasions.

Previous winners
1977: Al Sadd SC  Draw Al Rayyan SC (penalties)
1978: Al Sadd SC 2–1 Qatar SC
1979: Al Sadd SC 1–0 Al Ahli SC (Doha)
1980: Al-Arabi SC 2–1 Al Ahli SC (Doha)
1981: Al Sadd SC
1982: Al-Arabi SC 
1983: Qatar SC
1984: Qatar SC
1985: Al Sadd SC
1986: Al Sadd SC
1987: Qatar SC
1988: Al Sadd SC
1989: Al-Wakrah SC
1990: Al Sadd SC
1991: Al-Wakrah SC
1992: Al Rayyan SC
1993: Wasn't held
1994: Al-Arabi SC
1995: Qatar SC
1996: Al Shamal SC
1997: Al Sadd SC
1998: Al-Wakrah SC 2–0 Al Ahli
1999: Al Sadd SC 3–2 Al-Taawun
2000: Al Rayyan SC 2–0 Al-Taawun
2001: Al Sadd SC
2002: Al-Khor SC 1–0 Qatar SC (asdet)
2003: Al Shabab 2–1 Al-Wakrah SC (aet)
2004: Al-Wakrah SC 1–1 Qatar SC (aet, 3–1 pens)
2005: Al-Gharafa SC 2–1 Al Ahli SC 
2006: Al Sadd SC 2–0 Al Rayyan SC
2007: Al-Gharafa SC 4–2 Al-Sailiya SC (aet)
2008: Al-Arabi SC 3–0 Al Rayyan SC
2009: Umm Salal SC 2–0 Al-Khor SC
2010: Al-Arabi SC 1–0 Lekhwiya SC
2011: Al-Arabi SC 3–2 Umm Salal
2012: Al Rayyan SC 1–0 Al-Sadd
2013: Al Rayyan SC 2–0 Al Kharaitiyat
2014: Al Sadd SC 3–2 Lekhwiya SC
2015: Lekhwiya SC 4–1 Al Sadd SC
2016: Lekhwiya SC 2–0 Al Rayyan SC
2017: Al Sadd SC 4–2 Al-Duhail
2018: Al Rayyan SC 1–1 Al-Duhail SC (5–3 penalties)
2019: Al Sadd SC 1–0 Al-Duhail

NOTES:
1. The 2015 edition was played in January 2016 due to both teams competing in 2015 AFC Champions League

Role of honour

References

External links
 Sheikh Jassim Cup, Quatari Football Association
 Sheikh Jassim Cup - Hailoosport.com

 
National association football supercups